This article lists protocols, categorized by the nearest layer in the Open Systems Interconnection model. This list is not exclusive to only the OSI protocol family.  Many of these protocols are originally based on the Internet Protocol Suite (TCP/IP) and other models and they often do not fit neatly into OSI layers.

Layer 1 (physical layer)
 Telephone network modems
 IrDA physical layer
 USB physical layer
 EIA RS-232, EIA-422, EIA-423, RS-449, RS-485
 Ethernet physical layer 10BASE-T, 10BASE2, 10BASE5, 100BASE-TX, 100BASE-FX, 1000BASE-T, 1000BASE-SX and other varieties
 Varieties of 802.11 Wi-Fi physical layers
 DSL
 ISDN
 T1 and other T-carrier links, and E1 and other E-carrier links
 ITU Recommendations: see ITU-T
 IEEE 1394 interfaces
 TransferJet
 Etherloop
 ARINC 818 Avionics Digital Video Bus
 G.hn/G.9960 physical layer
 CAN bus (controller area network) physical layer
 Mobile Industry Processor Interface physical layer
 Infrared
 Frame Relay
 FO Fiber optics
X.25

Layer 2 (data link layer)

 ARCnet Attached Resource Computer NETwork
 ARP Address Resolution Protocol
 ATM Asynchronous Transfer Mode
 CHAP Challenge Handshake Authentication Protocol
 CDP Cisco Discovery Protocol
 DCAP Data Link Switching Client Access Protocol
 Distributed Multi-Link Trunking
 Distributed Split Multi-Link Trunking
 DTP Dynamic Trunking Protocol
 Econet
 Ethernet
 FDDI Fiber Distributed Data Interface
 Frame Relay
 ITU-T G.hn
 HDLC High-Level Data Link Control
 IEEE 802.11 WiFi 
 IEEE 802.16 WiMAX
 LACP Link Aggregation Control Protocol
 LattisNet
 LocalTalk
 L2F Layer 2 Forwarding Protocol
 L2TP Layer 2 Tunneling Protocol
 LLDP Link Layer Discovery Protocol
 LLDP-MED Link Layer Discovery Protocol - Media Endpoint Discovery
 MAC Media Access Control
 Q.710 Simplified Message Transfer Part
 Multi-link trunking Protocol
 NDP Neighbor Discovery Protocol
 PAgP -  Cisco Systems proprietary link aggregation protocol
 PPP Point-to-Point Protocol
 PPTP Point-to-Point Tunneling Protocol
 PAP Password Authentication Protocol
 RPR IEEE 802.17 Resilient Packet Ring
 SLIP Serial Line Internet Protocol (obsolete)
 StarLAN
 Space Data Link Protocol, one of the norms for Space Data Link from the Consultative Committee for Space Data Systems
 STP Spanning Tree Protocol
 Split multi-link trunking Protocol
 Token Ring a protocol developed by IBM; the name can also be used to describe the token passing ring logical topology that it popularized.
 Virtual Extended Network (VEN) a protocol developed by iQuila. 
 VTP VLAN Trunking Protocol
 VLAN Virtual Local Area Network

Network Topology 
 Asynchronous Transfer Mode (ATM)
 IS-IS, Intermediate System - Intermediate System (OSI) 
 SPB Shortest Path Bridging
 MTP Message Transfer Part
 NSP Network Service Part
 TRILL (TRansparent Interconnection of Lots of Links)

Layer 2.5
 ARP Address Resolution Protocol
 MPLS Multiprotocol Label Switching
 PPPoE Point-to-Point Protocol over Ethernet
 TIPC Transparent Inter-process Communication

Layer 3 (Network Layer)
 CLNP Connectionless Networking Protocol
 IPX Internetwork Packet Exchange
 NAT Network Address Translation
 Routed-SMLT
 SCCP Signalling Connection Control Part
 AppleTalk DDP
 HSRP Hot Standby Router protocol
 VRRP Virtual Router Redundancy Protocol
 IP Internet Protocol
 ICMP Internet Control Message Protocol
 ARP Address Resolution Protocol
RIP Routing Information Protocol (v1 and v2)
OSPF Open Shortest Path First (v1 and v2)
IPSEC IPsec

Layer 3+4 (Protocol Suites)
 AppleTalk
 DECnet
 IPX/SPX
 Internet Protocol Suite
 Xerox Network Systems

Layer 4 (Transport Layer)
 AEP AppleTalk Echo Protocol
 AH Authentication Header over IP or IPSec
 DCCP Datagram Congestion Control Protocol
 ESP Encapsulating Security Payload over IP or IPSec
 FCP Fibre Channel Protocol
 NetBIOS NetBIOS, File Sharing and Name Resolution 
 IL Originally developed as transport layer for 9P
 iSCSI Internet Small Computer System Interface
 NBF NetBIOS Frames protocol
 SCTP Stream Control Transmission Protocol
 Sinec H1 for telecontrol
 TUP, Telephone User Part
 SPX Sequenced Packet Exchange
 NBP Name Binding Protocol {for AppleTalk}
 TCP Transmission Control Protocol
 UDP User Datagram Protocol
 QUIC

Layer 5 (Session Layer)
This layer, presentation Layer and application layer are combined in TCP/IP model.
 9P Distributed file system protocol developed originally as part of Plan 9
 ADSP AppleTalk Data Stream Protocol
 ASP AppleTalk Session Protocol
 H.245 Call Control Protocol for Multimedia Communications
 iSNS Internet Storage Name Service
 NetBIOS, File Sharing and Name Resolution protocol - the basis of file sharing with Windows.
 NetBEUI, NetBIOS Enhanced User Interface 
 NCP NetWare Core Protocol
 PAP Printer Access Protocol
 RPC Remote Procedure Call
 RTCP RTP Control Protocol
 SDP Sockets Direct Protocol
 SMB Server Message Block
 SMPP Short Message Peer-to-Peer
 SOCKS "SOCKetS"
 ZIP Zone Information Protocol {For AppleTalk}
 This layer provides session management capabilities between hosts. For example, if some host needs a password verification for access and if credentials are provided then for that session password verification does not happen again. This layer can assist in synchronization, dialog control and critical operation management (e.g., an online bank transaction).

Layer 6 (Presentation Layer)
 TLS Transport Layer Security
 SSL Secure Socket Tunneling
 AFP Apple Filing Protocol
Independent Computing Architecture (ICA), the Citrix system core protocol
Lightweight Presentation Protocol (LPP)
NetWare Core Protocol (NCP)
Network Data Representation (NDR)
Tox, The Tox protocol is sometimes regarded as part of both the presentation and application layer
eXternal Data Representation (XDR)
X.25 Packet Assembler/Disassembler Protocol (PAD)

Layer 7 (Application Layer) 
 SOAP, Simple Object Access Protocol
 Simple Service Discovery Protocol, A discovery protocol employed by UPnP
 TCAP, Transaction Capabilities Application Part
 Universal Plug and Play
 DHCP Dynamic Host Configuration Protocol
 DNS Domain Name System
 BOOTP Bootstrap Protocol
 HTTP  Hyper Text Transfer Protocol 
 HTTPS
 NFS
 POP3 Post Office Protocol 
 SMTP
 SNMP
 FTP
 NTP
 IRC
 Telnet Tele Communication Protocol 
 SSH
 TFTP
 IMAP
 Gemini

Other protocols
 Controller Area Network

Protocol description languages
 Abstract Syntax Notation One (ASN.1)

See also

 List of automation protocols
 Systems Network Architecture (SNA) developed by IBM
 Distributed Systems Architecture (DSA) developed by Honeywell-Bull
 Distributed System Security Architecture (DSSA)
 OSI Model

References

Further reading

External links
 Protocol Encapsulation Chart - A PDF file illustrating the relationship between common protocols and the OSI Reference Model.
 Network Protocols Acronyms and Abbreviations - list of network protocols with abbreviations order by index.

Network protocols
OSI